Viranşehir is a market town serving a cotton-growing area of Şanlıurfa Province, in southeastern Turkey, 93 km east of the city Şanlıurfa and 53 km north-west of Ceylanpınar at the Syrian border. In Late Antiquity, it was known as Constantina or Constantia by the Romans and Byzantines, and Tella by the local Assyrian/Syriac population.

History 

According to the Byzantine historian John Malalas, the city was built by the Roman Emperor Constantine I on the site of former Maximianopolis, which had been destroyed by a Persian attack and an earthquake. During the next two centuries, it was an important location in the Roman/Byzantine Near East, playing a crucial role in the Roman–Persian Wars of the 6th century as the seat of the dux Mesopotamiae (363–540). It was also a bishopric, suffragan of Edessa. Jacob Baradaeus was born near the city and was a monk in a nearby monastery. The city was captured by the Arabs in 639.

The city became the base for the Ottoman statesman of Kurdish origin Ibrahim Pasha, leader of the Kurdish Milan tribe, in the late nineteenth century. Beginning in 1891, Ibrahim Pasha led several regiments of the state-sponsored tribal light cavalries known as the Hamidiye Brigades. He enjoyed the favor of Sultan Abdul Hamid II, and also extended protection to local Christian populations, with some 600 families taking up residence in the district by the early 1900s. The British spy and diplomat Mark Sykes claimed that Ibrahim Pasha had also saved some 10,000 Christians in the midst of the massacres of the 1890s. The historian Janet Klein writes that "on the eve of the Young Turk Revolution, Ibrahim Pasha was one of the most powerful figures in all of Kurdistan." Yet after the revolution, Ibrahim Pasha could no longer count on the support of the palace. He died on 27 September 1908 of dysentery, hotly pursued by Ottoman troops near Nusaybin.

On the eve of World War I, Viranşehir's Armenian population of numbered 1,339. The city's kaimakam apparently objected to May 1915 orders of raids on the population, but higher-ups eventually prevailed, and the entire population was massacred or sent to Ras al-'Ayn.

Modern city 
Thanks to the income from cotton, Viranşehir is one of the fastest-growing towns in Turkey, the population having more than doubled from 57,461 in 1990 to 121,382 in 2000 (census figures). (The urban population is 89,940 as of 2009.

The Mayor of Viransehir, Leyla Güven, was detained in December 2009 under Turkey's anti-terror legislation. Her trial began on 18 October 2010. She was released in July 2014 with 30 other local elected representatives, after four years of detention.

Salih Ekinci from the Justice and Development Party (AKP) was elected Mayor of Viranşehir in the 31 March 2019 Local Election. The current Kaymakam is Ömer Dereci.

Notable people
Bilge Özgen (1935*), Musical Artist
Şivan Perwer (1955*), Musical Artist
Nureddin Nebati (1964*), politician and currently serving as the Minister of Finance and Treasury of Turkey.  
Ayşe Sürücü (1983*), Politician
Semra Güzel (1984*), medical doctor and a politician
Deniz Kadah (1986*), Footballer

References 

Cities in Turkey
Populated places in Şanlıurfa Province
Districts of Şanlıurfa Province
Kurdish settlements in Turkey